Duane Jarvis (August 22, 1957 – April 1, 2009) was an American guitarist and singer-songwriter who recorded songs with many rock and roll and country music performers, including Frank Black, Peter Case, Rosie Flores, John Prine, Amy Rigby, Lucinda Williams, Dwight Yoakam, Gene Clark & Carla Olson.

In addition to his collaborations, which included co-writing "Still I Long For Your Kiss", a song on Williams's Grammy-winning album Car Wheels on a Gravel Road, he also released a number of solo albums.

He described his style as "country rock by way of the British Invasion" in a 1994 interview with The Oregonian, citing The Who, The Kinks, and The Rolling Stones as influences who themselves had borrowed much from roots music.

Personal life
Jarvis was born in Astoria, Oregon. 
Jarvis grew up in California, Oregon and Washington, with a mother who was a nurse and a father in the United States Coast Guard who would often play country music records. While living in Florida as a pre-teen, he received a guitar pick from B. B. King at the end of a concert he attended, which Jarvis kept for the rest of his life. He was part of a blues band and a power pop group while in his teens.

Jarvis died of colon cancer at age 51 on April 1, 2009, at his home in Marina del Rey, California.

Discography

Studio albums
 D.J.'s Front Porch (Twin/Tone- Medium Cool), February 22, 1994
 Far From Perfect (Watermelon), February 24, 1998
 Combo Platter (Glitterhouse), 1999 – Compilation of non-album studio tracks
 Certified Miracle (Slewfoot), July 31, 2001
 Delicious (Slewfoot), December 23, 2003

Compilations
 "Cocktail Napkin" on Nashville: The Other Side Of The Alley... Vol. 3 (Bloodshot, 1996)
 "Broken A/C Blues" on Down To The Promised Land: 5 Years Of Bloodshot Records (2000)
 "Squeaky Wheel" on Freight Train Boogie: A Collection of Americana Music (The Orchard, 2001)
 "There Is a Light" on The Rookie original soundtrack (Hollywood, 2002)
 "New Madrid" (with Dave Coleman) on For Anyone Thats Listening: A Tribute to Uncle Tupelo (Flat Earth Records. 2003)
 "Cupid Must Be Angry" on Lowe Profile: A Tribute to Nick Lowe (Brewery Records, 2005)

Other credits
 "Still I Long for Your Kiss" (cowr.) on Lucinda Williams, Car Wheels on a Gravel Road (1998)
 "A Girl That's Hip" (cowr.) performed by Tim Carroll, on Drop Dead Gorgeous original soundtrack (1999); and (as "Girl That's Hip") on Tim Carroll, Not for Sale (self-released 2000, re-released 2009)
 Guitar on Lucinda Williams, Sweet Old World (1992)
 Guitar on Greg Trooper, Everywhere (1992) (album)
 Guitar on Greg Trooper, Popular Demons (1998) (album)
 "Sold on You" (cowr., guitarist on album) on Rosie Flores, After the Farm (1992)
 Guitar and mandolin on Gene Clark/Carla Olson, Silhouetted in Light (1992) – reissued as In Concert Bass on John Prine, A John Prine Christmas (1994)
 Guitar, coproduction on David Childers, Hard Time County (1999) and A Good Way to Die (2001)
 Producer, guitar and mandolin on Danny Baseheart EP Hell Raisin’ Star Gazin'/Good Ole' Fashioned Evil (2002)
 Lead guitar on Amy Rigby, Til the Wheels Fall Off, on title track performed by Amy Rigby with Todd Snider (2003)
 Guitar on Ellis Hooks, The Hand of God (2003)
 Guitar on David Andrews, Everything to Lose (2004)
 Guitar on Frank Black, Fast Man Raider Man (2006)
 Guitar on Peter Case, Let Us Now Praise Sleepy John (2007)
 Guitars and background vocals on Matt Keating, Quixotic (2008)
 Dobro on Greg Koons and the Misbegotten, Nowhere Motel (June 23, 2009)
 Guitar on Black Francis, The Golem'' (2010, recorded 2008)

References

External links

1957 births
2009 deaths
Deaths from cancer in California
Deaths from colorectal cancer
Singer-songwriters from Oregon
People from Astoria, Oregon
20th-century American male singers
20th-century American singers
20th-century American guitarists
Guitarists from Oregon
American male guitarists